John Drew (September 3, 1827 – May 21, 1862) was an Irish-American stage actor and theatre manager.

Early life
Born Jonathan Henry Drewland in Dublin, Ireland, to Thomas L. Drewland and Louise Kanten, he was the fifth of six children. He lived in Templeogue, a poor Irish village in County Dublin during the 19th century. In 1832, John Drew emigrated to the United States with his family to Boston, Massachusetts. As a child he spent most of his life living in Boston. This is where he first got into acting. A younger brother, Frank Drew (1831–1903), also became an actor.

Career
After moving to the United States, Drew got a job in the theatrical company of Joseph J. Johlen (the theatre manager). He appeared in a number of Johlen's plays, including Uncle Mutch, The Barber Man, Canterbury of Livingston and The Progrist.

Drew made his first New York appearance in 1846. He played Irish and light comedy parts with success in many American cities, and was the manager of the Arch Street Theatre in Philadelphia.

Personal life
John married Louisa Lane in 1848 this being her third marriage and his first. They had three children, Louisa (1852–1888), John Jr. (1853–1927), and Georgiana (1856–1893), the latter two of whom were accomplished actors (Georgiana married Maurice Barrymore in 1876, begetting the Barrymore family; this makes John Drew a great-great-grandfather of actress Drew Barrymore).

Drew died at his home in Philadelphia, Pennsylvania at the early age of 34, after tripping, falling and fatally hitting his head during a party for daughter Georgiana. He was buried in Glenwood Cemetery in Philadelphia, which was later closed, and his remains were moved to Mount Vernon Cemetery. After his death, his wife Louisa took over the management of the Arch Street Theatre. The Arch Street survived until 1936 when it was demolished.

Publications
Moses, Famous Actor-Families in America (New York, 1906)

References

External links

1827 births
1862 deaths
19th-century American male actors
American theatre managers and producers
John Drew (actor)
Burials at Glenwood Cemetery/Glenwood Memorial Gardens
Burials at Mount Vernon Cemetery (Philadelphia)
Irish emigrants to the United States (before 1923)
Irish male stage actors
Male actors from Philadelphia
19th-century theatre managers
19th-century American businesspeople
Male actors from Boston